Flo Ankah is a French and naturalized American actress, director, and singer residing in New York City.  She founded Simple Production in 2006.

Career

Vocalist 
Known in the nightclub scene performing with jazz improvisers, she is the bandleader of the Third Set Collective. 

Flo stars in the Broadway-style musical Loving the Silent Tears, directed by Vincent Paterson, at the Shrine Auditorium. Her solo show Edith Piaf Alive premiered at Joe's Pub in the Public Theater; other sold out performances include Feinstein's/54 Below and Symphony Space; appearances include the Museum of Modern Art, Bryant Park and the New York Botanical Garden. Her interpretation of "Michelle" was included in The Beatles Complete on Ukulele.

Actress 
Flo Ankah has appeared in film (Listen Up Philip, Then She Found Me) and television (One Life to Live). Featured as a voice artist in feature films (Stillwater, Magic in the Moonlight,  My Old Lady, The Limits of Control), numerous television commercials, and is the voice for the French version of Vice News Tonight.  Performed for artists such as Mina Nishimura, and Meredith Monk (at the Solomon R. Guggenheim Museum).  Alumna of the Atlantic Acting School, and member of the Academy of Television Arts and Science since 2017.

Writer-Director 
One Way and Waterfront Access? are Flo Ankah's award-winning films.  She showed her choreography at Movement Research at the Judson Church, HERE Arts Center, and Dixon Place. Flo Ankah is an Alumna of the Kennedy Center Playwriting intensive.

Works 

Solo Performance
 Edith Piaf Alive - (2012) a play about the Little Sparrow, Joe's Pub.
 Love is French - (2013) a modern twist to vintage tunes, Miami-Dade County Auditorium.
 April in Paris - (2016) a musical tribute to the French spirit, Feinstein's/54 Below.

Art House Film
 ONE WAY - (2008) Best Experimental Film, 5th Big Apple Film Festival
 Waterfront Access? - (2010) Golden Reel Award, Tiburon International Film Festival

Playwriting
 Out of the Box - (2018) 10-mins play, Athena Writes Fellowship

Publications
 When Will Women Lead Storytelling in Hollywood? - Film essay published on the Clyde Fitch Report

References

External links 

 Official website
 

Living people
French film actresses
French women artists
French women singers
French singer-songwriters
French expatriates in the United States
Year of birth missing (living people)
21st-century French women writers
Naturalized citizens of the United States
21st-century American women